The Green Bay Chill was a women's American football team in the Legends Football League (formerly Lingerie Football League) that played from 2011 to 2014. The Chill played in Green Bay, Wisconsin, at the Resch Center from 2011 to 2013. In 2014, the team moved to Milwaukee, Wisconsin, with home games at U.S. Cellular Arena. Their first game in the 2014 season was set to take place in the U.S. Cellular Arena but it was rescheduled to July 12 citing lack of ticket sales. The July 12 game was the only Chill game played at the arena. The team was coached by former Green Bay Packer lineman Gilbert Brown.

2014 roster

Schedules

2011–2012

2013

2014

References

External links
 

Legends Football League US teams
American football teams in Wisconsin
Sports in Green Bay, Wisconsin
American football teams established in 2011
American football teams disestablished in 2013
2011 establishments in Wisconsin
2013 disestablishments in Wisconsin
Women's sports in Wisconsin